U.S. Alta Vallagarina is an Italian association football club located in Volano, Trentino-Alto Adige/Südtirol. It currently plays in Serie D. Its colors are red and blue.

Alta Vallagarina was formed in 2001 from the merger of U.S. Calliano and U.S. Volano, starting in the Prima Categoria.  In their second year they were promoted to the Promozione as champions of Group C.  After three years in the Promozione, the club were promoted to the Eccellenza following the 2005–06 season.  This was followed up with another promotion, to Serie D, after finishing first in the Eccellenza Trentino-Alto Adige/Südtirol.

External links
Official homepage
Alta Vallagarinapage @ Serie-D.com

Football clubs in Italy
Football clubs in Trentino
Association football clubs established in 2001
2001 establishments in Italy